Plastic shaman, or plastic medicine people, is a pejorative colloquialism applied to individuals who are attempting to pass themselves off as shamans, holy people, or other traditional spiritual leaders, but who have no genuine connection to the traditions or cultures they claim to represent. In some cases, the "plastic shaman" may have some genuine cultural connection, but is seen to be exploiting that knowledge for ego, power, or money.

Plastic shamans are believed by their critics to use the mystique of these cultural traditions, and the legitimate curiosity of sincere seekers, for their personal gain. In some cases, exploitation of students and traditional culture may involve the selling of fake "traditional" spiritual ceremonies, fake artifacts, fictional accounts in books, illegitimate tours of sacred sites, and often the chance to buy spiritual titles. Often Native American symbols and terms are adopted by plastic shamans, and their adherents are insufficiently familiar with Native American religion to distinguish between imitations and actual Native religion.

Overview 
The term "plastic shaman" originated among Native American and First Nations activists and is most often applied to people fraudulently posing as Native American traditional healers. People who have been referred to as "plastic shamans" include those believed to be fraudulent, self-proclaimed spiritual advisors, seers, psychics, self-identified New Age shamans, or other practitioners of non-traditional modalities of spirituality and healing who are operating on a fraudulent basis. "Plastic shaman" has also been used to refer to non-Natives who pose as Native American authors, especially if the writer is misrepresenting Indigenous spiritual ways (such as in the case of Ku Klux Klan member Asa Earl Carter and the scandal around his book The Education of Little Tree).

"It is a very alarming trend. So alarming that it came to the attention of an international and intertribal group of medicine people and spiritual leaders called the Circle of Elders. They were highly concerned with these activities and during one of their gatherings addressed the issue by publishing a list of Plastic Shamans in Akwesasne Notes, along with a plea for them to stop their exploitative activities. One of the best known Plastic Shamans, Lynn Andrews, has been picketed by the Native communities in New York, Minneapolis, San Francisco, Seattle and other cities."

Critics of plastic shamans believe there is legitimate danger to seekers who place their trust in such individuals. Those who participate in ceremonies led by the untrained may be exposing themselves to various psychological, spiritual and even physical risks. The methods used by a fraudulent teacher may have been invented outright or recklessly adapted from a variety of other cultures and taught without reference to a real tradition. In almost all "plastic shaman" cases a fraud is employing these partial or fraudulent "healing" or "spiritual" methods without a traditional community of legitimate elders to provide checks and balances on their behaviour. In the absence of the precautions such traditional communities normally have in place in regard to sacred ceremonies, and without traditional guidelines for ethical behavior, abuse can flourish.

People have been injured, and some have died, in fraudulent sweat lodge ceremonies performed by non-Natives.

Among critics, this misappropriation and misrepresentation of Indigenous intellectual property is seen as an exploitative form of colonialism and one step in the destruction of Indigenous cultures:

"The para-esoteric Indianess of Plastic Shamanism creates a neocolonial miniature with multilayered implications. First and foremost, it is suggested that the passé Injun elder is incapable of forwarding their knowledge to the rest of the white world. Their former white trainee, once thoroughly briefed in Indian spirituality, represents the truly erudite expert to pass on wisdom. This rationale, once again, reinforces nature-culture dualisms. The Indian stays the doomed barbaric pet, the Indianized is the eloquent and sophisticated medium to the outer, white world. Silenced and visually annihilated like that, the Indian retreats to prehistory, while the Plastic Shaman can monopolize their culture."

Defenders of the integrity of indigenous religion use the term "plastic shaman" to criticize those they believe are potentially dangerous and who may harm the reputations of the cultures and communities they claim to represent. There is evidence that, in the most extreme cases, fraudulent and sometimes criminal acts have been committed by a number of these imposters. It is also claimed by traditional peoples that in some cases these plastic shamans may be using corrupt, negative and sometimes harmful aspects of authentic practices. In many cases this has led to the actual traditional spiritual elders declaring the plastic shaman and their work to be "dark" or "evil" from the perspective of traditional standards of acceptable conduct.

Plastic shamans are also believed to be dangerous because they give people false ideas about traditional spirituality and ceremonies. In some cases, the plastic shamans will require that the ceremonies are performed in the nude, and that men and women participate in the ceremony together, although such practices are an innovation and were not traditionally followed. Another innovation may include the introduction of sex magic or "tantric" elements, which may be a legitimate form of spirituality in its own right (when used in its original cultural context), but in this context it is an importation from a different tradition and is not part of authentic Native practices.

The results of this appropriation of Indigenous knowledge have led some tribes, intertribal councils, and the United Nations General Assembly to issue several declarations on the subject:

 

Many of those who work to expose plastic shamans believe that the abuses perpetuated by spiritual frauds can only exist when there is ignorance about the cultures a fraudulent practitioner claims to represent. Activists working to uphold the rights of traditional cultures work not only to expose the fraudulent distortion and exploitation of Indigenous traditions and Indigenous communities, but also to educate seekers about the differences between traditional cultures and the often-distorted modern approaches to spirituality.

One indicator of a plastic shaman might be someone who discusses "Native American spirituality" but does not mention any specific Native American tribe. The "New Age Frauds and Plastic Shamans" website discusses potentially plastic shamans.

Terminology 
The word "shaman" originates from the Evenki word "šamán". The term came into usage among Europeans via Russians interacting with the Indigenous peoples in Siberia. From there, "shamanism" was picked up by anthropologists to describe any cultural practice that involves vision-seeking and communication with the spirits, no matter how diverse the cultures included in this generalisation. Native American and First Nations spiritual people use terms in their own languages to describe their traditions; their spiritual teachers, leaders or elders are not called "shamans". One significant promoter of this view of a global shamanism was the Beat Generation writer Gary Snyder, whose 1951 PhD thesis treated Haida religion as a form of shamanic practice, and whose subsequent poetry promotes the idea of the Pacific Rim as "a single cultural zone and a single bioregion." Other writers promoting the idea of a generalised shamanic religion in this period also include Robert Bly, who stated that "the most helpful addition to thought about poetry in the past thirty years has been the concept of the poet as a relative of the shaman ... I am a shaman." Snyder and Bly's remarks attest to the deep investment in shamanism in 1960s and 1970s counterculture. Leslie Marmon Silko would later condemn Snyder's appropriations of Native religions in her 1978 essay "An Old-Fashioned Indian Attack in Two Parts". Later, Michael Harner would develop the concept of neoshamanism, or "core shamanism", which also makes the unfounded claim that the ways of several North American tribes share more than surface elements with those of the Siberian Shamans.  This misappellation led to many non-Natives assuming Harner's inventions were traditional Indigenous ceremonies. Geary Hobson sees the New Age use of the term shamanism as a cultural appropriation of Native American culture by "white" people who have distanced themselves from their own history.

In Nepal, the term Chicken Shaman is used.

Documentary film 
A 1996 documentary about this phenomenon, White Shamans and Plastic Medicine Men, was directed by Terry Macy and Daniel Hart.

See also 

 Brooke Medicine Eagle
 Colonialism
 Cultural appropriation
 Cultural imperialism
 Declaration on the Rights of Indigenous Peoples
 Fraudulent Mediums Act 1951 - British legislation that both combats plastic shamanism and repeals the 1735 Witchcraft Act
 Hollywood Indian
 Huna (New Age)
 Indigenous intellectual property
 Iron Thunderhorse
 Legend of the Rainbow Warriors
 Native American hobbyism in Germany
 Native Americans in German popular culture
 Neoshamanism
 Noble savage
 Passing as Indigenous Americans
 Plastic Paddy
 Pretendian
 Q Shaman
 Rolling Thunder
 Stereotypes of Native Americans
 
 Traditional knowledge
 Twinkie (slur)
 Xenocentrism

Notes

References 

 Hobson, Gary. "The Rise of the White Shaman as a New Version of Cultural Imperialism." in: Hobson, G., ed. The Remembered Earth. Albuquerque, NM: Red Earth Press; 1978: 100–108.
 Lupa. New Paths to Animal Totems. Woodbury, MN: Llewellyn Worldwide, 2012. .

Further reading

 Berkhofer, Robert F. "The White Man's Indian: Images of the American Indian from Columbus to the Present"
 Bordewich, Fergus M. Killing the White Man's Indian: Reinventing Native Americans at the End of the Twentieth Century.
 Deloria, Philip J., Playing Indian. New Haven: Yale University Press, 1998. .
 Deloria Jr., Vine, "The Pretend Indian: Images of Native Americans in the Movies."
 Fikes, Jay Courtney. Carlos Castaneda: Academic Opportunism and the Psychedelic Sixties. Millenia Press, Canada, 1993 .
 Harvey, Graham, ed. Shamanism: A Reader. New York and London: Routledge, 2003. .
 Green, Rayna D. "The Tribe Called Wannabee". Folklore. 1988; 99(1): 30–55.
 Jenkins, Philip. Dream Catchers: How Mainstream America Discovered Native Spirituality. New York: Oxford University Press;  2004. .
 Kehoe, Alice B. "Primal Gaia: Primitivists and Plastic Medicine Men." in: Clifton, J., ed. The Invented Indian: Cultural Fictions and Government Policies. New Brunswick: Transaction; 1990: 193–209.
 Kehoe, Alice B. Shamans and Religion: An Anthropological Exploration in Critical Thinking. 2000. London: Waveland Press. .
 de Mille, Richard, The Don Juan Papers: Further Castaneda Controversies. 1980, Santa Barbara, CA: Ross Erikson Publishers. .
 Narby, Jeremy and Francis Huxley, eds. Shamans Through Time: 500 Years on the Path to Knowledge. 2001; reprint, New York: Tarcher, 2004. .
 Noel, Daniel C. Soul Of Shamanism: Western Fantasies, Imaginal Realities, Continuum International Publishing Group. .
 Rollins, Peter C. Hollywood's Indian : the portrayal of the Native American in film. Univ Pr of Kentucky, 1998. 
 Pinchbeck, Daniel. Breaking Open the Head: A Psychedelic Journey into the Heart of Contemporary Shamanism. New York: Broadway Books, 2002. .
 Rose, Wendy, "The Great Pretenders: Further Reflections on White Shamanism." in: Jaimes, M. A., ed. The State of Native America: Genocide, Colonisation and Resistance. Boston: South End; 1992: 403–421.
 Smith, Andrea. "For All Those Who Were Indian in a Former life". in: Adams, C., ed. Ecofeminism and the Sacred. New York: Continuum; 1994: 168–171.
 Wallis, Robert J., Shamans/neo-Shamans: Ecstasy, Alternative Archaeologies and Contemporary Pagans. London: Routledge, 2003. 
 Wernitznig, Dagmar, Going Native or Going Naive? White Shamanism and the Neo-Noble Savage. Lanham, Maryland, United States; University Press of America; 2003.  
 Znamenski, Andrei, ed. Shamanism: Critical Concepts, 3 vols. London: Routledge, 2004.

External links 
 New Age Frauds and Plastic Shamans
 Nuage Tricksters

Declarations and resolutions 
 United Nations Declaration on the Rights of Indigenous Peoples 
 Declaration of War Against Exploiters of Lakota Spirituality
 Resolution of the 5th Annual Meeting of the Traditional Elders Circle

Articles on selling native spirituality
 Dead Indians: Too Heavy to Lift 
 Exposing The Fake Medicine Men and Women
 Native Religions and "Plastic Medicine Men"
 Ownership of Indigenous Cultures
 Plastic Shamans and Astroturf Sun Dances: New Age Commercialization of Native American Spirituality
 Selling Native Spirituality
 The Selling of Indian Culture
 Spiritual Hucksterism: The Rise of the Plastic Medicine Men

First Nations culture
Cultural appropriation
Fraud
Indigenous politics
Native American religion
Neoshamanism
Supernatural healing
Slang
Traditional knowledge